The discography of American singer, rapper and songwriter Devvon Terrell consists of four studio albums, one collaboration album, two mixtapes, six extended plays and 85 singles (including 30 singles as a featured artist).

Albums

Studio albums

Collaborative albums

Mixtapes

Extended plays

Singles

As lead artist

As featured artist

Guest appearances

Notes

References

Rhythm and blues discographies
Hip hop discographies
Discographies of American artists